PostBank Uganda is a commercial bank in Uganda, licensed and supervised by the Bank of Uganda, the country's central bank and national banking regulator. The bank received her tier-1 banking license in December 2021.

Before that, PostBank Uganda was classified as a non-bank credit institution, still under the supervision of the Bank of Uganda.

Overview
, PostBank Uganda had total assets worth
UGX:745 billion (approx. US$193.3 million), with shareholders' equity worth UGX:117.1 billion (approx. US$30.4 million). At that time customer deposits totaled UGX:507.2 billion (approx. US$131.6 million), and its loan book stood at UGX:454.9 billion (approx. US$118 million).

History
PostBank Uganda has been in existence since 1926. It started out as a department in the Post Office. In February 1998 PostBank Uganda Limited was incorporated in accordance with the Communications Act of 1997 to take over the operations of the former Post Office Savings department.

PostBank Uganda was incorporated under the Companies Act in February 1998 as a limited liability company. The bank's operations are supervised by the Bank of Uganda under the Financial Institutions Act. Before December 2021, it was classified as a Tier II Institution (Non-Bank Credit Institution), by the Bank of Uganda (BOU). That month, it received a Tier I banking license from BOU.

Ownership
PostBank Uganda is wholly owned by the Government of Uganda.

Branch network
As of February 2021, PostBank Uganda maintained a branch network of 33 fixed branches and 17 mobile banking units, totaling 50 branches.

Fixed branches

 Arua Branch - Arua
 Bombo Branch - Bombo
 Bugolobi Branch - Bugoloobi, Kampala
 City Branch - Nkrumah Road, Kampala (Head Office)
 Entebbe Branch - Entebbe
 Fort Portal Branch - Fort Portal
 Gulu Branch - Gulu
 Hoima Branch - Hoima
 Iganga Branch - Iganga
 Jinja Branch - Jinja
 Kabale Branch - Kabale
 Kakiri Branch - Kakiri
 Kampala Road Branch - Kampala Road, Kampala
 Kamwenge Branch - Kamwenge
 Kanungu Branch - Kanungu
 Kasese Branch - Kasese
 Kayunga Branch - Kayunga
 Kitgum Branch - Kitgum
 Lacor Branch - Lacor Hospital, Gulu
 Lira Branch - Lira
 Masaka Branch - Masaka
 Mbale Branch - Mbale
 Mbarara Branch - Mbarara
 Mubende Branch - Mubende
 Mukono Branch - Mukono
 Nakasongola Branch - Nakasongola
 Ndeeba Branch - Ndeeba, Kampala
 Ntungamo Branch - Ntungamo
 Soroti Branch - Soroti
 Wandegeya Branch - Wandegeya, Kampala
 William Street - Kampala.
 Anaka Branch - Nwoya

Mobile branches
The mobile branches are located in the following towns and districts:
 Budaka - Budaka District
 Bududa - Bududa District
 Bukedea - Bukedea District
 Butaleja - Butaleja District
 Fort Portal - Kabarole District
 Kamwenge - Kamwenge District
 Kapchorwa - Kapchorwa District
 Kibaale - Kibaale District
 Kyegegwa - Kyegegwa District
 Kyenjojo - Kyenjojo District
 Manafwa - Manafwa District
 Pallisa - Pallisa District
 Sironko - Sironko District
 Tororo - Tororo District

Governance
The activities of PostBank Uganda are directed by its board of directors. , the chairperson of the board was Andrew Otenga Owiny. The day-to-day activities of the bank are supervised by a team of ten bank managers, headed by the managing director. As of November 2019, the managing director and chief executive officer is Julius Kakeeto.

See also

Banking in Uganda
List of banks in Uganda

References

External links
 Official Website

Financial services companies of Uganda
Financial services companies established in 1926
Companies based in Kampala
Government-owned companies of Uganda
Postal savings system
1926 establishments in Uganda